Marnik is an Italian progressive house duo formed by Alessandro Martello and Emanuele Longo.

History 

On 17 March 2017, Marnik scored their first hit with "Children of a Miracle", a collaborative effort with Don Diablo and Galantis singer Reece Bullimore of "No Money" fame.

In December 2017, Marnik worked with The Golden Army worked and Kshmr on a psy-trance big room house-influenced track called "Shiva".

In May 2018, in collaboration with Steve Aoki, they released a dance version of "Bella ciao", a traditional folk protest song from the 19th century that became very popular within the anti-fascist movement during the Italian civil war (1943-1945). Marnik's version of the track generated controversy as many commentators felt it was inappropriate and disrespectful towards the Italian partisans struggle.

Discography

Singles

References 

Italian musical duos

Progressive house musicians
Italian dance music groups
Italian electronic music groups
Musical groups from Milan